Podlyasovo (older name )  is a rural locality (a village), in  Anayevskaya rural Locality of Zubovo-Polyansky District, Mordovia, Russia.

Etymology
Pre-Christian Moksha male name Poldya or Polda was the name of the founder.

History
Mentioned in 1614 among 9 villages of Steldema belyak together with "Anayeva, Shapkino, Poshatova, Selische, Paramzina, Zheravkina, Kargashina, 1/2 Avdalova".

Geography 
Podlyasovo is located on Vad river, in 18 km from M5 highway in 45 km from Zubova Polyana (the district's administrative centre), and 35 km of by road and 22 km of Vad (station).

Sources

References 

Rural localities in Mordovia
Zubovo-Polyansky District